The Turkish Women's Basketball Cup (Turkish: Basketbol Kadınlar Türkiye Kupası), also known as Bitci Turkish Women's Basketball Cup for sponsporship reasons, is a basketball cup competition in Turkish basketball, run by the Turkish Basketball Federation since 1992. The current champions are Fenerbahçe, who are also the most successful team in the history of the competition, with 13 titles to their credit.

Finals

Source:

Performance by club

See also 
 Turkish Women's Super League
 Turkish Women's Presidential Cup

References

Cup
Women's basketball cup competitions in Europe
Women
1992 establishments in Turkey